Ollga Plumbi (1898 – 1984) was an Albanian feminist, activist and politician. She also was elected as deputy of the Albanian parliament in 1945 but became known as one of the first feminists in Albania.

Biography 
Ollga Plumbi, also known with her pen name Shpresa was born in the village of Lupckë of Përmet in 1898. After her husband died when she was young, she went to immigrate in the West to work in order to take care of her family and worked. She later returned to Albania and during 1936-1937 wrote in the publication "Bota e Re" along other progressive writers like Migjeni and Selim Shpuza. 

During the Second World War she became part of the anti-fascist movement and later was elected as the head of Women's Antifascist Council of Albania. In the elections of 1945 she became a deputy of the People's Parliament and was second most voted deputy, behind only Enver Hoxha. 

However soon she was removed from the post and sidelined from politics, but she still would write extensively on the feminism and gender equality.

See also
 Sevasti Qiriazi
 Parashqevi Qiriazi
 Fatbardha Gega
 Urani Rumbo
 Musine Kokalari

References

1898 births
1984 deaths
Albanian feminists
Albanian women's rights activists
People from Gjirokastër County
20th-century Albanian women politicians
20th-century Albanian politicians
Members of the Parliament of Albania
Women members of the Parliament of Albania